Journey of Akaki is a 1912 Georgian documentary film directed by Vasil Amashukeli.

Plot 
The film shows the love of Georgian society to the poet Akaki Tsereteli, as well as the nature and traditions of Georgia.

The director captured episodes of the journey. They shot about 1500 meters of film. After editing, 1200 m remained. About 400 m have reached our time. The author managed to reflect the people's love for the poet, to show the way of life in Georgia, Georgian traditions and nature.

Release 
The film was first shown at the Radium Cinema in Kutaisi on September 20, 1912. Akaki Tsereteli attended the premiere. For two weeks, the film was held in Kutaisi with a full house. A copy of the film is stored in the National Archives of the Ministry of Justice of Georgia.

References

External links 

1912 films
Documentary films from Georgia (country)
1910s Russian-language films
Russian silent short films
Russian black-and-white films
Russian short documentary films
1912 documentary films
Films of the Russian Empire
1912 short films
1910s short documentary films